In functional analysis, a branch of mathematics, the Shilov boundary is the smallest   closed subset of the structure space of a commutative Banach algebra where an analog of the maximum modulus principle holds. It is named after its discoverer, Georgii Evgen'evich Shilov.

Precise definition and existence 
Let  be a commutative Banach algebra and let  be its structure space equipped with the relative weak*-topology of the dual .
The set  is called the Shilov boundary.

Thus one may also say that Shilov boundary is the unique set  which satisfies

Examples 

References

Notes

See also 
 James boundary
 Furstenberg boundary

Banach algebras